General elections were held in Malta between 2 and 4 September 1950. Following the Labour Party splitting into the Malta Labour Party and the Malta Workers Party, the Nationalist Party emerged as the largest party, winning 12 of the 40 seats.

Electoral system
The elections were held using the single transferable vote system.

Results

Aftermath
In the aftermath of the election the Nationalist Party formed a coalition government with the Workers Party. However, the two parties had a difficult relationship, and early elections were held less than a year later.

References

General elections in Malta
Malta
1950 in Malta
September 1950 events in Europe
1950 elections in the British Empire